The International Inventions Exhibition was a world's fair held in South Kensington in 1885. As with the earlier exhibitions in a series of fairs in South Kensington following the Great Exhibition, Queen Victoria was patron and her son Albert Edward, the Prince of Wales, was president of the organising committee. It opened on 4 May and three and three-quarters of a million people had visited when it closed 6 months later.

Countries participating included Austria-Hungary, Italy, Japan and the United States as well as the hosts, the United Kingdom.

Attractions included pleasure gardens, fountains and music as well as inventions. One series of concerts including old instruments from Belgium. Other historical exhibits included five heliographs by Niépce with modern photographers such as Captain Thomas Honywood also being present.

Inventions included folding tables, the Sussex trug, lacquer covered wire from OKI, a meter from Ferranti, a 38-stop organ equipped with a new floating-lever pneumatic action, and Philip Cardew won a gold medal for his hot-wire galvanometer, or voltmeter.

See also
 Expo 91: 1991 World's fair for young inventors
 Henry Willis & Sons for more organ information
 International Fisheries Exhibition 1883
 International Health Exhibition 1884

References

External links

 https://archive.org/details/b22449152/page/n4
 Contains an image of the exhibition buildings

1885 in London
World's fairs in London
1885 in international relations
History of inventions
South Kensington
1885 festivals